Vegetative symptoms are disturbances of a person's functions necessary to maintain life (vegetative functions). These disturbances are most commonly seen in mood disorders, and are part of the diagnostic criteria for depression, but also appear in other conditions.

Vegetative symptoms in a patient with typical depression include:
 Weight loss and loss of appetite
 Insomnia
 Fatigue and low energy
 Inattention.

Reversed vegetative symptoms
Reversed vegetative symptoms include only oversleeping (hypersomnia) and overeating (hyperphagia), as compared to insomnia and loss of appetite. These features are characteristic of atypical depression.

However, there have been studies claiming that these symptoms alone are sufficient to diagnose the condition of atypical depression.

See also
Sleep disorder
Dysautonomia

References

Symptoms and signs of mental disorders